Červenka is a municipality and village in Olomouc District in the Olomouc Region of the  Czech Republic. It has about 1,400 inhabitants.

Notable people
Jaroslav Svoboda (born 1980), ice hockey player

References

Villages in Olomouc District